The 9th Annual Tony Awards, presented by the American Theatre Wing, took place at the Plaza Hotel Grand Ballroom on March 27, 1955. It was broadcast on radio by the National Broadcasting Company. The presenter was Helen Hayes and music was composed and presented by Meyer Davis and his Orchestra.

Award winners
Sources: Infoplease BroadwayWorld

Production

Performance

Craft

Special award
Proscenium Productions, an Off-Broadway company at the Cherry Lane Theatre, for generally high quality and viewpoint shown in The Way of the World and Thieves Carnival. Presented to Warren Enters, Robert Merriman and Sybil Trubin.

Multiple nominations and awards

The following productions received multiple awards.

3 wins: The Pajama Game and Peter Pan    
2 wins: The Desperate Hours, Quadrille and Witness for the Prosecution

References

External links
Tony Awards Official Site

Tony Awards ceremonies
1955 in theatre
1955 awards
1955 in the United States
1955 in New York City
1955 awards in the United States
March 1955 events in the United States